Kenneth Curtis may refer to:

Kenneth M. Curtis (born 1931), former American Governor, Ambassador, party chairman, and lawyer
Kenneth L. Curtis (born 1965), initially found incompetent to stand trial for the killing of his girlfriend, found competent 10 years later
Ken Curtis (1916–1991), American singer and actor